is a manzai duo whose theme is that of a French-born Japanese nobleman (Louis Yamada LIII) and his butler (Higuchi-kun). The group are signed as talent of the Sun Music Productions entertainment company. In addition to their comedy careers, they also act. After both voiced main characters in the anime series Tentai Senshi Sunred (Yamada LIII as Vamp and Higuchi-kun as Combat Goon #1), Yamada LIII began appearing in a regular role in the tokusatsu series Tensou Sentai Goseiger. Higuchi-kun will appear as an announcer in the Goseiger film Epic on the Movie. The duo also serves as spokesmen for Sumitomo Realty & Development.

Members
 Yamada is the duo's tsukkomi. His official profile states that he was born on the Champs-Élysées in Paris, and attended the Sorbonne.
 Higuchi is the duo's boke from Jōnan-ku, Fukuoka, Fukuoka Prefecture. He attended Kwansei Gakuin University, graduating with a degree in sociology.

References

External links
Official profile at Sun Music
Higuchi-kun's blog

Japanese comedy duos